Cervatos de la Cueza is a municipality located in the province of Palencia, Castile and León, Spain. According to the censuses (INE) since 1900, the population has continued to decline. In 1900 a population of 808 inhabitants was reported, falling to 397 in 2000, and most recently being reported at 262 inhabitants in 2018.

References

Municipalities in the Province of Palencia